Pell is a surname.

Pell may also refer to:

 Pell (musician) (born 1992), American rapper
 Pell (One Piece), a minor character in the Japanese anime One Piece
 Pell Airfield, Northern Territory, Australia
 Pell Grant, an American federal education grant program
 Pell Inlet, a waterway in Nunavut, Canada
 Pell Office, a historic department of the British government
 Pell's equation, a mathematical equation
 Pell's World and Pell Station, a fictional planet and orbital station in C. J. Cherryh's Alliance–Union universe

See also
 Pelle (disambiguation)